The 1950 Japan Series was the Nippon Professional Baseball (NPB) championship series for the 1950 season. It was the first Japan Series and featured the Pacific League champions, the Mainichi Orions, against the Central League champions, the Shochiku Robins.

Summary

Matchups

Game 1
Wednesday, November 22, 1950 – 1:16 pm at Meiji Jingu Stadium in Shinjuku, Tokyo

Game 2
Thursday, November 23, 1950 – 1:01 pm at Korakuen Stadium in Bunkyo, Tokyo

Game 3
Saturday, November 25, 1950 – 1:30 pm at Koshien Stadium in Nishinomiya, Hyōgo Prefecture

Game 4
Sunday, November 26, 1950 – 1:31 pm at Hankyu Nishinomiya Stadium in Nishinomiya, Hyōgo Prefecture

Game 5
Monday, November 27, 1950 – 12:59 pm at Nagoya Baseball Stadium in Nagoya, Aichi Prefecture

Game 6
Tuesday, November 28, 1950 – 1:29 pm at Osaka Stadium in Osaka, Osaka Prefecture

See also
1950 World Series

References

Japan Series
Japan Series
Japan Series
Japan series